The men's large hill individual ski jumping competition for the 1968 Winter Olympics was held in Saint-Nizier-du-Moucherotte. It occurred on 18 February.

Results

References

Ski jumping at the 1968 Winter Olympics